Reeves is a surname. Some notable persons with the surname include:

 A. J. Reeves (born 1999), American basketball player
 Al Reeves (1864–1940), American vaudeville entertainer
 Alan Reeves (footballer), English former football player
 Alec Reeves (1902–1971), English electronics engineer
 Amber Reeves, feminist writer
 Ana Reeves, Chilean television, film and theatre actress
 Anita Reeves (died 2016), Irish film and stage actress
 Bass Reeves, famous lawman from the late 1800s
 Billy Reeves (footballer)
 Bryant Reeves, American basketball player
 Charles Stephen Reeves (1836–1912), New Zealand businessman and Mayor of Dunedin
 Charles Reeves (architect) (1815–1866), British architect
 Conner Reeves, British singer-songwriter
 Christopher B. Reeves, Emmy-winning sound editor
 Connie Douglas Reeves, cowgirl
 Dan Reeves (1944–2022), American football player and coach
 Del Reeves (1932–2007), American country music singer
 Dennis Reeves, Scottish former football player
 Dianne Reeves, American jazz singer
 Edith Reeves, American silent film actress
 George Reeves, American actor
 George R. Reeves, Texas legislator after whom Reeves County, Texas is named
 Hubert Reeves, Canadian astrophysicist and science writer
 James Reeves (disambiguation)
 Jim Reeves (1923–1964), American country music singer and songwriter
 John Reeves (disambiguation)
 Joseph M. Reeves, American admiral
 Keanu Reeves, American-Canadian actor
 Kenneth Reeves, mayor of Cambridge, Massachusetts
 Lois Reeves, singer, sister of Martha Reeves
 Martha Reeves (born 1941), American R&B singer
 Matt Reeves, American film writer, director and producer
 Maud Pember Reeves, feminist and socialist
 Melissa Reeves, American actress
 Michael Reeves, American internet personality
 Mike Reeves (footballer), English football player
 Mike Reeves (baseball), Canadian baseball player
 Milton Reeves, creator of the OctoAuto
 Olivia Reeves (born 2003), American weightlifter
 Orlando Reeves, the mythological namesake of Orlando, Florida
 Pamela L. Reeves, American judge
 Paul Reeves, former archbishop and Primate of New Zealand
 Perrey Reeves, American actress
 Rachel Reeves, British politician
 Richard Reeves (disambiguation)
 Ron Reeves, Australian rules footballer
 Ron Reeves (gridiron football), American football player
 Ryan Reeves (born 1981), American professional wrestler better known as Ryback
 Samantha Reeves, American tennis player
 Saskia Reeves, British actress
 Siân Reeves, British actress
 Steve Reeves, American bodybuilder, actor and author
 Steve Reeves (computer scientist), New Zealand computer scientist
 Stevie Reeves, auto racing driver
 Thomas James Reeves, American Medal of Honor recipient
 Tim Reeves, Australian historian, author of works about the murder of George Duncan
 Tim Reeves (born 1972), English sidecar racer
 Triette Reeves, American politician
 Vic Reeves, pseudonym for comedian James Roderick "Jim" Moir
 William Reeves (disambiguation)

Fictional characters
 Tad Reeves, fictional character

See also 
 Reeve (surname)
 Reaves, surname

English-language surnames
Occupational surnames